High School King of Savvy is a 2014 South Korean television series starring Seo In-guk, Lee Ha-na, Lee Soo-hyuk, and Lee Yul-eum. It aired on tvN from June 16 to August 11, 2014 on Mondays and Tuesdays at 23:00 (KST) time slot for 17 episodes.

Synopsis
Lee Min-suk (Seo In-guk) is a high school student and varsity ice hockey player. He and his older brother Hyung-suk look very much alike, despite their nine-year age gap. When he gets a mysterious phone call from Hyung-suk telling him to impersonate his brother at the latter's new job, Min-suk is forced to pretend to be a high-ranking executive at an IT conglomerate. Living a double life while unaware of the rules within the Korean workplace, Min-suk learns how to navigate his way in the world of adults with the help of Jung Soo-young (Lee Ha-na), a temp with an odd personality whom he eventually falls in love with.

Cast

Main
 Seo In-guk as Lee Min-suk / Lee Hyung-suk
 Seo Dong-hyun as young Lee Min-suk
Lee Min-suk is 18 years old high school student, who is impersonating his brother Lee Hyung-suk (28 years old) at the latter's new job as director of Retail Team at Comfo company.
 Lee Ha-na as Jung Soo-young
Contract employee of Retail Team at Comfo company, later Retail Team's director's secretary, 28 years old.
 Lee Soo-hyuk as Yoo Jin-woo
Director of Project Team at Comfo company, illegitimate son of company's chairman, 30 years old. 
 Lee Yul-eum as Jung Yoo-ah
Jung Soo-young's sister, 18-year old high school student.

Supporting

People around Lee Min-suk 

 Oh Kwang-rok as Choi Jang-ho, Lee Min-suk's and Lee Hyung-suk adoptive father
 Kwon Sung-duk as Choi Man-suk, Lee Min-suk's and Lee Hyung-suk adoptive grandfather

People at Poong Jin High School 

 Kang Ki-young as Jo Duk-hwan, Lee Min-suk's friend and classmate
 Lee Tae-hwan as Oh Tae-suk, Lee Min-suk's friend and classmate
 Kim Seung-hoon as Kim Dae-chul, Lee Min-suk's ice hockey coach
 Ji Yoon-ho as Park Ki-hoon, Lee Min-suk's senior in ice hockey team

People at Comfo company 

 Han Jin-hee as Yoo Jae-guk, chairman of Comfo company
 Song Young-kyu as Nam Sang-goo, director of Comfo company
 Jo Han-chul as Kim Chang-soo, team leader of Retail Team
 Kim Won-hae as Han Young-suk, director of Comfo company
 Park Soo-young as Yoon Dong-jae, assistant manager of Retail Team
 Choi Phillip as Park Heung-bae, employee of Retail Team
 Lee Joo-seung as Ji Dae-han, employee of Retail Team
 Lee Ah-rin as Han Sang-hee, employee of Retail Team
 Shin Hye-sun as Go Yoon-joo, employee of Retail Team
 Chun Yi-seul as Yoon Do-ji, employee of Retail Team

Special appearances 
 Yoon Yoo-sun as Yoo Jin-woo's mother
 Jang Se-hyun as Yoo Jin-woo's friend
 Min Ji-ah as Jung Soo-young's hometown friend
 Shim Hyung-tak as a busy boyfriend
 Lee Chung-ah as attractive girl
 Park Hee-von as contract girl
 Hana as Park Jin-joo
 Yein as Lee Bit-na

Production
The first script reading was held on April 25, 2014 at the CJ E&M Centre in Sangam-dong, Seoul, South Korea. Filming commenced in early May 2014.

Seo trained with the Kwangwoon University hockey team for two months in preparation for his role as an ice hockey player.

On July 22, 2014, it was announced that the series would be extended by one episode, and a special broadcast would be aired following the end of the 17 episodes.

Original soundtrack

Ratings
 In this table,  represent the lowest ratings and  represent the highest ratings.
 N/A denotes that the rating is not known.

Awards and nominations

International broadcast
 tvN Asia
  - Workpoint TV: starting February 1, 2015
  - GTV: starting May 29, 2015
  - Tv9: starting February 16, 2016
  - Joy Prime

References

External links
  
 
 

2014 South Korean television series debuts
2014 South Korean television series endings
TVN (South Korean TV channel) television dramas
South Korean comedy-drama television series
South Korean romance television series
Television series by Chorokbaem Media
Television series about teenagers